Matveyevskaya is a rural locality (a village) in Verkhovskoye Rural Settlement, Verkhovazhsky District, Vologda Oblast, Russia. The population was 8 as of 2002.

Geography 
The distance to Verkhovazhye is 19.5 km, to Smetanino is 3.5 km. Kalinino, Smetanino, Otvodnitsa are the nearest rural localities.

References 

Rural localities in Verkhovazhsky District